Dr. Gary Lash is an American geologist and member of AAPG. He was a professor emeritus at SUNY Fredonia and former adjunct professor at the University at Buffalo. He nominated by Foreign Policy for 2011 FP Top 100 Global Thinkers with Dr. Terry Engelder. In 2019, Dr. Lash received the John T. Galey Memorial Award from the American Association of Petroleum Geologists.

References
 Retrieved 2015-08-30. http://www.post-gazette.com/local/region/2013/10/27/Fracking-guru-talks-energy/stories/201310270158
 AAPG Notable Papers. Retrieved 2015-02-08. http://archives.datapages.com/data/bulletns/2011/01jan/BLTN09150/BLTN09150.HTM
 Retrieved 2015-02-09. https://foreignpolicy.com/2011/11/28/the-fp-top-100-global-thinkers-4/
 Retrieved 2020-08-27. https://www.observertoday.com/news/page-one/2019/11/fredonia-geoscientist-awarded-the-aapg-eastern-sections-highest-honor/
 Retrieved 2020-08-27. https://fredonia.smartcatalogiq.com/en/2018-2019/Catalog/Faculty/Geology-and-Environmental-Sciences-Faculty

Kutztown University of Pennsylvania alumni
Lehigh University alumni
Living people
American geologists
Year of birth missing (living people)